1911 in Argentine football saw Alumni regain the championship for the third time in succession, by beating Porteño in a championship playoff. It was the team's 10th title in 12 seasons and was also its last tournament disputed so the football team was disbanded at the end of the season due to financial problems.

Primera División
The 1911 championship featured 9 teams, with each team playing the other twice. Racing Club made its debut.

Final standings

Championship playoff
Alumni and Porteño finished level on points at the top of the table, being necessary the dispute of a playoff match, won by Alumni.

Lower divisions

Intermedia
Champion: Estudiantes (LP)

Second Division
Champion: Riachuelo B

Third Division
Champion: Racing Club

Domestic cups

Copa de Honor Municipalidad de Buenos Aires
Champion: Newell's Old Boys

Final

Copa Jockey Club
Champion: San Isidro

Final

International cups

Tie Cup
Champion:  Wanderers

Final

Copa de Honor Cousenier
Champion:  CURCC

Final

Argentina national team
Argentina won a new edition of the Copa Newton and Copa Premier Honor Argentino but the squad lost the Copa Lipton and the first edition of Copa Premier Honor Uruguayo at the hands of Uruguay.

Copa Lipton

Copa Newton

Copa Premier Honor Uruguayo

Copa Premier Honor Argentino

Notes

References

 
Seasons in Argentine football